Two-time defending champion Esther Vergeer defeated Korie Homan in the final, 6–3, 6–3 to win the women's singles wheelchair tennis title at the 2008 Australian Open.

Seeds

Draw

Finals

Wheelchair women's singles
2008 Women's Singles